Carlos Peralta (born 30 January 1994) is a Spanish swimmer. He competed in the men's 200 metre butterfly event at the 2016 Summer Olympics.

References

External links
 

1994 births
Living people
Spanish male butterfly swimmers
Olympic swimmers of Spain
Swimmers at the 2016 Summer Olympics
Place of birth missing (living people)
Swimmers at the 2013 Mediterranean Games
Mediterranean Games competitors for Spain

Spanish LGBT sportspeople